Claire Scovell LaZebnik is an American novelist/author. She is the wife of American television writer Rob LaZebnik, with whom she has four children. She is also the sister of television writer Nell Scovell and of children's book writer Alice Scovell Coleman. She was raised in Newton, Mass and attended Newton South High School. She graduated from Harvard University in 1985.

Her novels include Same as It Never Was, Knitting Under the Influence, and The Smart One and the Pretty One. She has co-written two books on autism with Dr. Lynn Koegel of the Koegel Autism Research Center at the University of California at Santa Barbara. In the first, Overcoming Autism, she writes at the end of each chapter about her son, who was diagnosed with autism at age two and a half. In the second, Growing up on the Spectrum (2009), the everyday issues of adolescents with autism are addressed.

References

External links
 Claire LaZebnik official website
 
 Power Couples Harvard Magazine Article on Claire and husband, Rob
family:
 Rob LaZebnik-IMDb
 Johnny Lazebnik-IMDb

Living people
21st-century American novelists
American women novelists
Year of birth missing (living people)
21st-century American women writers
American women non-fiction writers
21st-century American non-fiction writers
Newton South High School alumni
Harvard University alumni